An API, or application programming interface, is any defined inter-program interface.

API or api may also refer to:

Companies and organizations 
 Academic Programs International, an American study-abroad provider
 American Petroleum Institute, an American trade-lobbying and international-standardization organization
 AmeriStat Pharmaceuticals, Inc., a US-based international wholesaler and exporter of pharmaceuticals and medical supplies
 Animal Protection Institute, an American non-profit organization
 Anonima Petroli Italiana, an Italian petrol (gasoline) company
 Associated Producers Incorporated a B picture subsidiary of 20th Century Fox
 Athletes' Performance Institute, an American training facility for competitive athletes
 Australian Pharmaceutical Industries
 Australian Property Institute, an Australian professional organization in valuation
 Automated Processes, Inc., an American audio electronics company
 Automobile Products of India, an Indian automotive company
 Aviation Partners Inc., an American aviation components company

In education 
 Academic Performance Index, a measure of scholastic performance used in California, United States
 Auburn University, formerly known as Alabama Polytechnic Institute

Places 
 Api (mountain), Nepal
 Api Chamber, a large cave chamber in Malaysia
 Mount Api, Malaysia

In politics 
 Alliance for Italy, a centrist political party in Italy
 Arab Peace Initiative, a peace initiative proposed in 2002 at the Beirut Summit of the Arab League

In science and technology
Active pharmaceutical ingredient, a basic component of any medicine or pharmaceutical drug
Advanced primer ignition, a type of blowback operation for firearms that ignites the primer when the bolt is still moving with the goal of increasing rate of fire and decreasing felt recoil.
Petroleum industry nomenclature deriving from American Petroleum Institute
API gravity, a measure of the density of petroleum
API number, a unique identifier applied to each petroleum exploration or production well drilled in the United States
API unit, a standard measure of natural gamma radiation measured in a borehole
Analytical Profile Index, a miniaturized panel of biochemical tests compiled for identification of groups of closely related bacteria
API oil-water separator
Air Pollution Index, a measure of air quality used in Hong Kong and Malaysia
Armor-piercing incendiary, a type of armor-piercing shot and shell
Atmospheric pressure ionization, a type of ionization in mass spectrometry
Apnea–hypopnea index, an index used to indicate the severity of sleep apnea

Other uses
Advance passenger information, passenger name record collected by commercial transportation operations
Asian-Pacific Islander
Aviation Preflight Indoctrination, the first major phase of training for a United States Naval Aviator
Announcement in the public interest, an alternate name for a public-service announcement
International Phonetic Alphabet, a system of phonetic notation (known in French as the alphabet phonétique international)
Api (apple), an apple cultivar.

See also
 AP1 (disambiguation)
API Network, an Australian organisation of public intellectuals, and book publisher